Ovis longipes palaeo-aegyptiacus is a type of the extinct wild barbary sheep found in the ancient Southern Egypt and Nubia. The ovacaprines were domesticated and often depicted on the stone tomb murals of the pharaohs for religious or aesthetic purposes. Ovis longipes palaeo-aegyptiacus was one of the two most commonly domesticated sheep utilized on the reliefs of early pharaonic tombs mostly because of its unique loosely spiraling horns which came out of the sides of the skull. A similar form of the sheep called Ovis platyura aegyptiaca had horns that developed downward and curled forward.

Later on, these two variants of sheep came to presume important religious significance as well as domestic use. Herodotus recounts that early Egyptians did not wear wool, but some scholars argue that it was meant only for the priests and that there is archaeological evidence, including the body of a man wrapped in wool dating to the First Dynasty in a burial at al-Helwan, that delineates this point. The use of this sheep is also unique in Egyptian depiction of their early deities. In fact, "the standard representation of Egyptian gods, were first developed, and naturally the ram-headed deities wore the horns of the then prevailing Ovis longipes palaeoaegyptiacus and retained them even long after the sheep itself had died out."

Sources

Sheep
Ancient Egypt
Ovis